L. Ian MacDonald (born 1947) is a Canadian writer, broadcaster, and diplomat.

Biography 
MacDonald graduated from Concordia University (Loyola) in 1969 with an honours degree in political science. He has been a columnist for the Montreal Gazette and the defunct Montreal Daily News, and has been a sessional lecturer at Concordia University.

He wrote his first book in 1984, "Mulroney: The Making of the Prime Minister", a bestseller that covered Brian Mulroney's rise from boyhood to Prime Minister of Canada. MacDonald served as chief speechwriter for Mulroney from 1985 to 1988. He served as Minister of Public Affairs at the Canadian Embassy in Washington, D.C., from 1992 to 1994.

MacDonald has published five more books, all with McGill-Queen's University Press, most recently Politics, People & Potpourri, selected by CBC  as "one of the best political reads" of 2009, and inside Politics, a collection published in 2018. He writes frequently for Canadian newspapers and news sites. Now editor and publisher of Policy magazine, a bi-monthly on Canadian politics and public policy, he was previously editor from 2002 to 2012, of Policy Options, published by the Institute for Research on Public Policy. 

He has two daughters—Grace, born in 1990, and Zara, born in 2009.

He was enshrined in the Concordia University Sports Hall of Fame in 2002 as part, as equipment manager, of the Loyola College Warriors 1968 hockey team.  Their Cinderella story (15 win, 1 loss) season took them to the National Championships, where after beating #1 University of Toronto in double overtime, they lost in the University Cup final 5–4 to the University of Alberta.

Publications 

 Mulroney: The Making of the Prime Minister, by L. Ian MacDonald, 1984.
 Free Trade: Risks and Rewards, edited by L. Ian MacDonald, 2000.
 From Bourassa to Bourassa: Wilderness to Restoration, by L. Ian MacDonald, 2002.

 Leo: A Life, by Leo Kolber, with L. Ian MacDonald, 2003.
 Politics, People & Potpourri, by L. Ian MacDonald, 2009.
 Inside Politics, by L. Ian MacDonald, 2018.
 Politics & Players, by L. Ian MacDonald, 2022.

References

External links 
L. Ian MacDonald's website

1947 births
Living people
Writers from Montreal
Canadian non-fiction writers
Loyola College (Montreal) alumni
Anglophone Quebec people
Montreal Gazette people